The Society of Authors ZAiKS (where the acronym stands for the Society′s original founding name, Society of Authors and Stage Composers,  or ZAiKS), established 1918, was for many years the sole legal Polish copyright collective, and has remained the dominant one, following the loss of its de facto government-granted monopoly in 1995 as a result of entry into force of the new copyright law of Poland. It is a member of BIEM, CISAC and GESAC. Its headquarters are located in Warsaw at the ″House Under the Kings″, the former seat of the Załuski Library.

The organization represents artists and composers with the mission of "defending their copyright rights". It has been subject to some criticism, for example for claiming rights to collect royalties for artists who are not its members, as well as for monopolistic practices. At one point the organization declared that it wants to collect royalties for works distributed under free licenses, but has since withdrawn from that position.

See also
Copyright law of Poland

External links

Copyright collection societies
Cultural organisations based in Poland
Organizations established in 1918
1918 establishments in Poland
Polish intellectual property law